Athletics competitions at the 1990 Micronesian Games were held in San Antonio, Saipan, Northern Mariana Islands, in July, 1990.

A total of 27 events were contested, 14 by men and 13 by women.

Medal summary
Medal winners and their results were published on the Athletics Weekly webpage
courtesy of Tony Isaacs.

Men

Women

Medal table (unofficial)

References

Athletics at the Micronesian Games
Athletics in the Northern Mariana Islands
Micronesian Games
1990 in Northern Mariana Islands sports